Trapezidae is a family of bivalves belonging to the superfamilt Arcticoidea of the order Venerida. 

Genera:
 Coralliophaga Blainville, 1824
 Fluviolanatus Iredale, 1924
 Langvophorus Vu Khuc, 1977
 Neotrapezium Habe, 1951
 Pronoe Agassiz, 1843
 Pronoella Fischer, 1887
 Pseudotrapezium Fischer, 1887
 Straelenotrapezium Glibert & van de Poel, 1970
 Trapezium Megerle von Mühlfeld, 1811

References

Venerida
Bivalve families